Bergen County Jail is a facility operated by the Bergen County Sheriff's Office located at 160 South River Street in Hackensack, New Jersey. The jail provides a detention for both sentenced and unsentenced prisoners from minimum to maximum security environment. There are computer controls of inmate housing areas, in addition to alarm system and a computerized center control.

The jail also houses detainees of the U.S. Immigration and Customs Enforcement.

References

External links
Bergen County Sheriff's Office - Bergen County Jail

Hackensack, New Jersey
Jails in New Jersey
Bergen County, New Jersey
Buildings and structures in Bergen County, New Jersey